Patricia Nelson  née Black is a former provincial level politician from Alberta, Canada. As a member of the ruling Progressive Conservative Party of Alberta, she served as a Member of the Legislative Assembly of Alberta for the Calgary-Foothills electoral district from 1989 to 2004.  During this time she served as a minister in a number of portfolios: Energy, Economic Development and Tourism, Government Services, and Finance.  She also served as Deputy Government House Leader and as a member of Treasury Board.

Political career
Black was elected to the Legislative Assembly of Alberta for the first time in a hotly contested three-way race in the 1989 Alberta general election. She won her second term in office in the 1993 Alberta general election, winning in a landslide. Nelson won her third term in office in the 1997 Alberta general election, again by a large majority.

Black married in 1998 and changed her last name to Nelson.

Nelson won her fourth term in office with another massive landslide victory in the 2001 Alberta general election.

During her years as finance minister in the governments of Premier Ralph Klein, Nelson oversaw the retirement of the Alberta provincial debt.

References

 

Living people
Women government ministers of Canada
Finance ministers of Alberta
Members of the Executive Council of Alberta
Politicians from Calgary
Progressive Conservative Association of Alberta MLAs
Female finance ministers
Women MLAs in Alberta
21st-century Canadian women politicians
Year of birth missing (living people)